Irmi Krauser (born 14 January 1948) is a German gymnast. She competed in six events at the 1968 Summer Olympics.

References

External links
 

1948 births
Living people
German female artistic gymnasts
Olympic gymnasts of West Germany
Gymnasts at the 1968 Summer Olympics
People from Straubing
Sportspeople from Lower Bavaria